Already in the 9th century, the Kievan Rus' had a powerful naval fleet which is proved by the successful naval Siege of Constantinople of 860. However, the naval fleet was irregular and was built only for the purpose of raids. Due to several major weakness of the naval fleet and in addition destructive invasion by the Mongol Empire, later the irregular naval fleet of the Kievan Rus principalities was dissolved. Except for the Principality of Novgorod which had access to the open seas (such as the Baltic Sea and the White Sea) and also was saved from Mongol invasions. In the 14th century, raids by Novgorod pirates, or ushkuiniki, sowed fear as far as Kazan and Astrakhan. As the first and proper Russian state of the Grand Duchy of Moscow begun and also got access to open water bodies, the Golden Age of the Russian Navy began. In 1570, in order to protect Russian navigation at the Baltic Sea, Ivan the Terrible created a flotilla which existed for about a year. In the 16th century, the Tsardom of Russia fought against the Ottoman Empire to get free access to the Black Sea.

In the 17th century, the Russian sailors actively studied the seas of the Arctic Ocean and the Arctic Ocean itself. By the end of the century, they reached the Pacific Ocean. In 1648 the Russian sailor Semyon Dezhnev discovered the Bering Strait which separates Asia and the Americas. In the mid-17th century a naval command was established at the White Sea to make it secure.

Marine operations were actively conducted during the Russo-Swedish War of 1656–1658. Thus, a detachment of Governor of Brovsky Peter Potemkin was sent to Izhora Land part of Sweden. The detachment acted in a support of flotilla belonging to the Don Cossacks, who had experience of the sea trips in the Black Sea. The whole army of Potemkin consisted of 570 Don Cossacks and 430 local volunteers. In June 1656, Potemkin and his unit crossed the border to Sweden and on June 13, 1656, besieged the fortress of Notburg. Part of the detachment were sent to the mouth of Neva River and on July 10, 1656, he occupied the Nyenschantz fortress left by the Swedes, located at the mouth of Okhta River, at the confluence of Okhta and Neva rivers. Then Governor Potemkin with a part of his forces and flotilla of the Don Cossacks landed on the Kotlin Island. On August 1, 1656, decisive naval battle took place between the Cossack flotilla (which had the strength of 15 battleships) and the Swedish Navy (which had a 30 Galley) near the Kotlin Island. The Russians broke out through the Swedes gunfire and took the flagship-6 ships to boarding. The rest of the Swedish ships were forced to retreat. The battle was won by the Cossacks and they capture the 12 Swedish galleys, naval equipments and also a number of Swedish soldiers including their commander. The battle near the Kotlin Island didn't give any significant impact on the course of Russo-Swedish War of 1656–58, according to the terms of the peace treaty of 1661 between the Grand Duchy of Moscow and the Swedish Empire, Russians destroyed their all ships at the Baltics. However, the Battle of Kotlin was marked by historians as the first victory of the modern Russian Navy.

The first Russian ship of the Western European style the Orel Frigate, was built in 1667. Peter the Great created the first regular Russian navy. In May 1688, the young Tsar Peter who was barely 16 years at the time discovered a small boat presented to his father (Tsar of Russia at that time). After the repairing of the boat, Tsar Peter experience himself Yauza and Prosyanoye pond. The amusing fleet created by Peter in 1688 - 1693, was the forerunner of the regular Russian fleet.

Further events developed at the White Sea. Peter I's interest in the only Russian seaport at that time was Arkhangelsk, arose simultaneously with the plan to build a fleet. Tsar Peter arrived in Arkhangelsk at the summer of 1693. On August 7, 1693, Tsar arrived at Kholmogory, where he was received by Andrey Matveyev and on July 30, 1693, he finally reached to Arkhangelsk. Over two months, the Tsar spent in Arkhangelsk, he met with the ship business and commercial operations of the commercial people and ordered the construction of the first shipbuilding shipyard in Russia on Solombala Island.  From the middle of the 17th century, the shipyard, which already had slipways, workshops, warehouses, and other ancillary enterprises, became known as the Arkhangelsk Admiralty. On September 28, 1693, Tsar Peter himself laid the naval ship here – the 24-gun frigate Saint Paul.

Next, Peter I turned his gaze to the Azov and Black Seas. As a result, the regular fleet was also laid in the shipyards of the Voronezh Admiralty. The campaign of the Russian Army to the Ottoman Empire's Azov Fortress in 1695 ended in failure - the siege of the fortress had no success. The complete blockade of Azov failed because the Russians did not have a fleet. The fortress was supplied with fighters, provisions and ammunition from the sea by the Ottoman Navy.

Only in the winter of 1695-1696 the first ships and ships were built, and the Second Azov campaign proved successful. On June 6, 1696, the fleet built in the Voronezh Admiralty shipyards entered the Sea of Azov and cut off the fortress of Azov from sea sources, and on July 29 the Azov garrison surrendered. On July 30, 1696, the fortress Lyutikh, located at the mouth of the northernmost arm of the Don, also surrendered.

The founding day of the Russian Navy, October 30 is celebrated every year.

Navy under Peter the Great 

The Baltic Fleet was built under Peter the Great during the Great Northern War of 1700 - 1721. Constructions of galley fleets were launched in 1702 until 1704. A sailing fleet of ships built in Russia and bought in other countries was created to protect the conquered coasts and to attack the enemy sea routes of communication in the Baltic Sea. In the years 1703 - 1723 the main naval base of the Baltic fleet was in Saint Petersburg and later in Kronstadt. The new bases were established in Vyborg, Helsingfors, Revel and Turku.

In 1725, the Russian Empire had 130 sailing ships, including 36 battleships, 9 frigates, 3 Snow and 77 auxiliary vessels. The army fleet consisted of 396 ships, including 253 galleys and 143 brigantines. The ships were built in 24 shipyards which were located in following cities: Voronezh, Kazan, Pereslavl-Zalessky, Arkhangelsk, Olonets, Saint Petersburg, and Astrakhan.

Naval officers coming from the families of nobleman and sailors were recruited from the common citizens. Service in the navy was for life and there was no retirement. Young officers studied in the school of mathematics and navigation sciences founded in 1701 and often were sent abroad for training. Foreigners can also join the naval service, for example Scottish Thomas Gordon served as the commander of Kronstadt port.

Comparison of the Russian Navy with the other dominant naval powers (1820s) 

Among the four global navies: Imperial Russian Navy, Great Britain Navy, French Navy and the Ottoman Navy; The United Kingdom of Great Britain and Ireland was the undisputed naval superpower, while followed by Russian Empire And France. While, the Swedish Navy rapidly declined since starting of the 19th century.

The Russian Navy after the death of Peter the Great 
After the death of Peter the Great, the Imperial Russian Navy deteriorated sharply. In 1726 only 54 ships were built and in the period of 1727–1730 no ships were built.

In 1728, the Swedish envoy to Russia tells his government about the situation of the Russian Navy:
{{Blockquote|text="Despite the annual construction of the galleys, the Russian galley fleet, compared with the former, is greatly reduced; the ship's ship is falling into direct ruin, because the old ships are all rotten, so more than four or five ships of the line cannot be brought into the sea, and the construction of new ones has weakened. In the admiralty, such disregard is such that even in three years the fleet cannot be brought back to its former condition, but no one thinks about it.|sign=Swedish envoy to Russia|source=}}
At the end of 1731, the ship fleet consisted of 36 battleships, 12 frigates and 2 shnyavas, but only 29.63% of the regular number of battleships were fully combat-ready, another 18.52% could operate in the Baltic only in the most favorable season, without storms . In total, Russia could launch into the sea 8 fully operational battleships and 5 into the closest voyage in the Baltic. All the ships of major ranks – 90, 80, 70-guns – failed. Only one 100-gun ship, five 66-gun guns and seven 56 62-gun guns remained combat-ready and partially combat-ready.

The condition of the galley fleet, which included 120 galleys, was relatively satisfactory. In 1726, Vice-Admiral Peter Sivers proposed to introduce a peaceful state for the galley fleet, which was implemented in 1728. Constantly 90 galleys afloat were kept on the fleet, another 30 galleys kept the forests prepared for quick assembly.

During the reign of Peter II, the intensity of the combat training of fleet crews sharply decreased. In April 1728, the emperor at a meeting of the Supreme Privy Council ordered that only four frigates and two flutes go out to sea from the entire fleet, and five more frigates were ready for cruising. The remaining ships were to remain in the ports for "saving the treasury. " To the arguments of the flagships that it is necessary to constantly keep the fleet at sea, the emperor replied: "When the need calls for the use of ships, then I will go to sea; but I do not intend to walk on it like a grandfather ". The poor state of the treasury and irregular salary payments led to an outflow of officers, which caused a drop in discipline among soldiers and sailors.

 Navy under Anna of Russia (1730–1740) 
Since she becomes Emperess of Russia the main challenge for Anna of Russia was to rebuild the Russian fleet and put it in the line of dominant naval powers. On August 1, 1730, she issued her personal decree ''On the maintenance of the galley and ship fleets according to the regulations and charters" .In December 1731, Empress Anna orders the Baltic fleet to resume the exercises and access to the Baltic Sea, in order to "have this and people’s training and genuine inspection of ships, because in the harbor it’s impossible to inspect the ship’s rigging and other damage".

In 1732, the Military Maritime Commission established itself under the chairmanship of Vice-Chancellor Andrey Ostermanto reform the fleet, which included Vice-admiral Nikolai Govolin, Vice-admiral Naum Senyamin, Vice-admiral Thomas Sanders, Rear-admiral Peter Bredal and Rear-admiral Vasily Mamonov, a management reform was introduced and the new fleets were added.

Comparison of 1726 and 1732 Russian fleets:

The total number of battleships grow from 7 to 27. The total gunpower of the fleet also grow rapidly.

In August 1732, a historic decision was made to restore the port of Arkhangelsk (closed in 1722) and the military shipbuilding in Solombala, which played a huge role in the development of fleet and shipbuilding. The Solombala Shipyard became the second main construction base of Baltic fleet and became operational in 1734. During the reign of Empress Anna, 52% of all Baltic fleet ships were built in Solombala shipyard and later during the reign of Empress Elizabeth, 64% of the ship were built in Saint Petersburg.

The restoration of Arkhangelsk shipyard made it possible to quickly deploy the construction of large number of ships at once. The Arkhangelsk shipyard became in fact the main shipbuilding base of the baltic fleet. The availability of skilled labours, the shorter delivery times and its better organisation led to the fact that the cost and construction time of the ships in Arkhangelsk were less than in St. Petersburg.

In 1734, during the War of the Polish Succession, the Russian fleet under the command of Thomas Gordon set for the Siege of Danzig, his commanded fleet consisted of 14 battleships, 5 frigates and 46 small vessels.

Despite the decline of the shipbuilding program due to War with the Ottomans, when the Dneiper and the Azov flotillas were in heavy construction under the reign of Empress Anna there was certain progress in the Russian fleet. After the end of the war with Turkey, the Admiralty resumed intensive fleet construction as soon as possible.

 Imperial Russian Navy in the second half of the 18th century 
In the second half of the 18th century, the Russian fleet was strengthened due to the more active foreign policy of Russia and the Russian success in domination of Black Sea. For the first time Russia sends naval fleets from the Baltic Sea to Murmansk. During the Battle of Chesma in 1770, the units under the command of Admiral Grigory Spiridov defeated the Ottoman flotilla and achieved dominance at Aegean Sea. In 1771, Russians captured the coasts of Kerch Strait. The Russo-Turkish War of 1768-1774 ended with Russian victory, as a result the entire coast of the Azov Sea was passed to Russia. Crimea was declared as an independent state under the Russian protectorate and later in 1783 it became fully part of Russia. In 1778 the port of Kherson was established, in which the first ship of the Black Sea Fleet was launched in 1783. A year later, there was already a full squadron. By 1791, the fleet consisted of 67 battleships, 40 frigates and 300 rowing ships.

 Early 19th century 

In the beginning of the 19th century, the Russian Navy became the 2nd largest and powerful naval force in the world just behind the British Navy. The Black Sea Fleet had 74 battleships and 124 frigates in 1834, the Baltic Fleet had 87 battleships and 212 frigates in the following year.

Between 1803 and 1855, Russian navigators made more than 40 round of the world and long-distance journeys, which played a significant role in the development of Far East.

 Crimean War 

The slow economic and industrial development of Russia in the first half of the 19th century caused its lag behind Europe and more specifically, the British Empire. By the beginning of the Crimean War in 1853, Russia had the Black Sea, Baltic, Caspian and Okhotsk fleets, with a total of 49 battleships, 28 frigates, 30 corvettes and 36 old galleys ready for the war .The total number of fleet personnel was 137,082.

The Battle of Sinop in 1853 demonstrated the courage, heroism and magnificent combat skills of the Russian sailors. During the 1854-55 Siege of Sevastopol, Russian Navy personnel set an example of using all possible means to protect their city's coasts and central territory. According to the results of the harsh 1856 Treaty of Paris, Russia lost the right to have the navy on the Black Sea, In the 1860s Russia's other fleets also start losing their value.

 Late 19th century 
The Russian fleet continued to expand in the late 19th century, especially during the reign of Emperor Nicholas II, who was very influenced to the doctrine of American naval theorist, Alfred Mahan. Despite that Russian industry was developing at high rate, but it couldn't fulfil the ever growing needs of the Russian Navy. Because of this Russia was forced to order ships and fleet equipments from abroad; including France, Germany and Denmark. French ship designs had a greater influence on Russian Naval ships.

During the American Civil War, Russia sends two squadrons of cruiser to help the American Union government from the North. This shows how the small forces can achieve the great political success. The presence of only eleven small warships in areas of lively merchant shipping turned out to be that the major European powers (British Empire, French Empire and Ottoman Empire) refused to confrontate Russia, defeated by them only 7 years ago.

 Russo-Japanese War 

On the night of February 8, 1904 the Imperial Japanese Navy under the command of Tōgō Heihachirō began military operations against the Russian Empire. As result of sudden attack on Port Arthur, two Russian battleships were seriously damaged by Torpedoes. This attack developed into a full-scale battle known as Siege of Port Arthur the next morning. Several attempts by the Japanese Navy to attack Russian fleets were failed due to coastal artillery fire and the reluctance of the Russian fleet to leave the harbor for battle on the high seas, especially after the death of Admiral Stepan Makarov on April 13, 1904.

After unsuccessful attack on Port Arthur by the Japanese Navy, the Japanese fleet tried to close access to it. Attempt to block the port was also unsuccessful.

In March, Vice admiral Marakov took command of the First Pacific Squadron to lift the Japanese blockade of Port Arthur. By that time, both sides began to widely use the tactics of mining sea lanes near the ports. For the first time in history, mines were used by the attacking side - before that, mines were used only for defensive purposes in order to prevent enemy ships from gaining access to the harbor.

The Japanese tactics of using mines were quite effective and significantly limited the maneuverability of Russian ships. On April 13, 1904, two Russian battleships (Petropavlovsk and Pobeda), were blown up by mines at the exit of the harbour.

Soon the Russians adopted the Japanese mining tactics and began to use it for attacking purposes. On May 15, 1904, two Japanese battleships, Yashima and Hatsuse, stumbled upon a fresh minefield and exploded at least two mines each. The Hatsuse sank within just a few minutes with 450 sailors on board, the Yashima went to the bottom for a few hours while towing to the port.

The Russian fleet under the command of Rear Admiral Vitgeft made an attempt to break the blockade and go to Vladivostok, but was intercepted and suffered heavy losses in the Yellow Sea. The remnants of the Russian squadron in Port Arthur were gradually flooded with fire besieging Port Arthur of the Japanese artillery. Attempts to break the blockade of Port Arthur from the land also failed, and after the Battle of Liaoyang in late August, Russian forces retreated to Mukden ( Shenyang ). Port Arthur, including the detachments of sailors formed from the crews of the submerged ships, fell on January 2, 1905, after several bloody storms.

The Russian command sent a squadron of the Baltic Fleet under the command of Admiral Zinovy Rozhestvensky to help besieged Port Arthur around the Cape of Good Hope across the Atlantic, Indian and Pacific Oceans. On October 21, 1904, they almost provoked a war with the British Empire (an ally of Japan, but a neutral state during this war) during the Dogger Bank incident, when the Russian fleet shelled British fishing vessels, mistaking them for Japanese destroyers. This squadron was later destroyed in the Battle of Tsushima.

 Reconstruction of the fleet: pre-World War era 
After the destruction of the Russian Navy in Russo-Japanese War, the naval power of the Russian Empire was reduced and it fall from the 2nd largest Navy to the fourth largest navy in the world (now behind Great Britain, France, Japan and Spain). On March 19, 1906, by decree of the Emperor Nicholas II, a new kind of Russian force was made part of the Russian Navy- Submarines force which only consist of submarines (17 at that time) was commissioned. Since then March 19 is celebrated in Russia a national holiday- Submarines Day. In the same year, a new program of military shipbuilding began to be actively developed and discussed - the "Program for the Development and Reform of the Armed Forces of Russia", known as the "Small Shipbuilding Program", which was approved by Emperor Nicholas II on June 6, 1907, but later the appropriations were reduced, and the program itself was called "Distribution of appropriations for shipbuilding" (before 1911, it was planned to complete the construction of already launched ships and lay 4 artillery ships and 3 submarines for BF, as well as a new naval base; and for the Black Sea Fleet - 14 destroyers and 3 submarines) [S. 31] and was partially approved by the State Duma in the spring of 1908. The Bosnian crisis in 1909 again raised the issue of expanding the fleet and new battleships, cruisers, and destroyers (now mostly destroyers) were ordered for the Baltic Fleet. It is worth noting that, according to the personal order of Emperor Nicholas II [S. 32] new battleships were laid, the appropriations for which were previously rejected by the State Duma.

Since 1909, the new shipbuilding program, the Ten-year Shipbuilding program (1910 - 1920) was actively prepared, the So-called Big Shipbuilding Program, which in its final stage envisaged the construction of the Baltic Fleet: 26 battleships, 9 linear ship cruisers, 49 destroyers and 35 submarines; Black Sea Fleet: 46 destroyers and 29 submarines and the 245 vessels for the Pacific Fleet as well as the reequipment and modernisation of several battleships. The program was approved on March 25, 1910 by Emperor Nicholas II, but until 1911 was not considered by the State Duma . Rearmament also included a large participation of foreign partners - the cruiser Rurik and the equipment of other ships were ordered to foreign shipyards. After the outbreak of World War I, ships and equipment ordered in Germany were confiscated. Equipment from England was partially transferred by the Allies and partially delivered to Russia.

 Most powerful navies of the world by 1910s 

In 1911, the Navy Ministry and the Naval General Staff begin to continue the 1910 program. Ultimately, their work led to the fact that on April 25, 1911, Nicholas II approved the "Bill on the Navy", together with its primary part - the "Program of hastily strengthening the Baltic Fleet.

 Top 10 Countries by Navy Budget (1913) 

 World War I 

 Baltic Sea 

On the Baltic Sea, the combatants were the Russian Empire and the German Empire. A large number of British submarines sailed through the Kattegat Strait to support the Imperial Navy against the German Navy. Since the Russian Navy was much larger than the Germans, but the Germans had the geographic advantage since they can transfer the ships of the High Seas Fleet from the North Sea to the Baltic Sea through the Kiel Canal, but the Russian Navy Officers has the strategy to counter their any advantages. Offensive operations were limited to interceptions of convoy shipments between Sweden and Germany by Russian and British submarines, as well as the use of siege minefields - minefields for attacking purposes.

The larger use of naval mines for offensive and defensive purposes by both the Russians and the German Navies, limited the maneuverable operations of fleet on the Eastern Front. The Battle of the Gulf of Riga between the German and Baltic fleets resulted in a Russian Victory.

During the First World War, the ships of the Baltic Fleet conducted mine-barrage operations (delivered 35 thousand mines), and also acted on the communications of the German fleet, assisted ground forces and provided the defense of the Gulf of Finland .

 Black Sea 

On the Black Sea, the main opponent of Russia was the Turkish Ottoman Empire. Admiral A.A. Eberhard and Admiral A.V. Kolchak commanded the Black Sea Fleet with its main base in Sevastopol. The war on the Black Sea begin after the Ottoman Navy bombarded several Russian cities in October 1914. The most perfect ships in the Turkish fleet at that time were two German ships: the Goeben and Breslau, both under the command of Admiral Souchon. Goeben was damaged in several battles, and his usual tactic was to retreat to the Bosphorus when the superior forces of the Russian Black Sea Fleet appeared. By the end of 1915, the Black Sea Fleet secured almost complete control over the Black Sea.

The Black Sea Fleet was also used to support General Nikolai Yudenich's Caucasian Army (see Caucasus Front ). In the summer of 1916, the Ottoman Army under the command of Vehip Pasha made an attempt to repel the city of Trabzon from the Russians. The Turks began to move along the coast in July, but the Black Sea Fleet, by its actions, managed to significantly slow down their progress through the shelling of infantry columns and their wagons. The Russian army launched a counter-offensive and defeated the advancing Turkish ground forces.

July 15, 1916, Vice Admiral Alexander Kolchak took command of the Black Sea Fleet of the Russian Empire. Alexander Vasilievich considered the main strategic task to be the complete mining of the exit from the Bosphorus to the Black Sea.

By the autumn of 1916, it was possible to establish a complete blockade of all sources of coal for the Ottoman Empire (ports of Zunguldak, Kozlu, Eregli, Kilimli).

Throughout 1916 and up to the spring of 1917, active preparation for the Bosphorus operation .

According to some researchers, the active and competent activities of A.V. Kolchak on mining the exit from the Bosphorus and the port of Varna, led to the establishment of complete domination. Black Sea Fleet and "not a single enemy vessel" did not appear in the Black Sea area until the summer of 1917.

The biggest loss of the Black Sea Fleet was the death of the battleship "Empress Maria", which exploded at the anchorage in the port on  October  7 (20), 1916, having been in service only one year after it entered service. The causes of the explosion were not clarified, according to some historians, it could be the result of an act of sabotage, in the opinion of others, an accident. A.V. Kolchak personally supervised the operation to rescue seafarers and extinguish a fire.

 Naval forces of the Red Army 

The source of the Soviet Navy was the early Naval Forces of the Red Army. The civil war in Russia destroyed the Russian Navy rapidly.

Due to huge loss of warships (some sunks during the battle or captured enemy navy or completely lost their combat ability). The displacement of the Red Army Naval forces in early 1921 was 29% of their total naval fleet. Losses of anti-mine ships and boats were the least sensitive, and the most severe in the class of cruisers.

Red Army fleet in 1920s:

The general degradation has affected other types of fleet forces. Thus, the number of coastal artillery batteries in the Baltic decreased by three times, on the Black Sea - twice, and in the Russian north, the coastal defense system ceased to exist at all. The air units of the Red Army base were liquidated in 1920, and only a few air detachments remained in the operational control of the naval commanders, which by the beginning of 1921 had only 36 obsolete aircraft with a high degree of physical wear.

The policy of downsizing the fleet taken by the Soviet Government led to the fact that from March 1921 to December 1922 the number of personnel of the Red Army Naval Forces was reduced from 86,580 to 36,929 people, and the amount of appropriations for military shipbuilding and ship repair was reduced by about 3.3 times.

 Development of Navy (1924 - 1927) 

 1924 
March 28, 1924: The Directorate of the Naval forces was established. The head of the directorate was the commander of the Navy E.S. Plantzhanzhansky, who was directly subordinate to the Peoples's Commissioner for Military and Naval Affairs of the Soviet Union, Leon Trotsky. Management of the Navy was intended to guide the operational, recovery, personnel, administrative, educational, technical, hydrographic and scientific activities of the naval forces of the country.

Management of the Navy was to carry out:

 Consideration of the military and mobilization capabilities of the Baltic fleet and Caspian flotilla.
 Consideration of requirements for the restoration and construction of military ships in storage.

April 2, 1924: The Headquarters of the Red Army (chief M.V. Frunze ) prepared a summary statement on meeting the needs of the Soviet military fleet in terms of special supplies and special materials that cannot be manufactured at factories within the republic for a number of reasons.

April 12 - E. S. Pantzerzhansky, Head of the Red Army Navy, presented a report to the Naval Inspectorate of the TsKK RCP (b) on the naval department ’s strategic plans and on the urgent resolution of the issue of further naval construction.

On April 25, the Military Commissar and Assistant Chief of Staff of the Red Army of the USSR Mikhail Tukhachevsky, in pursuance of the decision of the Naval Inspectorate of the TsKK RCP (b), prepared and sent out to the Red Army Air Force Chief Arkady Rosengolts, Red Army Inspector Yu.M. Scheidemann, Chief of Supply of the Red Army, I. S. Unshlikht, Chief of the Artillery Directorate of the Red Army, V. K. Sadlutsky, Assistant Chief of Staff of the Red Army, B. M. Shaposhnikov, and Chief of the Naval Forces of the Red Army, E. S. Pantzerzhansky, circular letter.

"Please prepare materials:

 To find out the possibilities in the development of our production in the field of artillery and aviation, both in our industry and through orders abroad;
 Find out the possibility of building new factories for the implementation of the planned program;
 All of these opportunities should be scheduled in a five-year program;
 In connection with the planned construction program, the issue of personnel training, as well as the provision of all types of supplies should be worked out.

The first meeting is scheduled for 15:00 on April 30, for which I ask to send your representatives with all the materials. Your personal involvement is highly desirable. "

July 9 - The USSR Council of Labor and Defense (Chairman Lev Kamenev) decided to purchase minesweepers abroad to demine the waters of the Black and Azov seas from the minefields there .

September 12 - SNK USSR developed a plan on the issue of shipbuilding :

 By examining the factories, it is possible to identify the expediency of including in the program military shipbuilding both in the North and in the South, since it is possible to start the completion of the construction of warships immediately.
 Invert for military shipbuilding in 1924/25 2.6 million rubles. of the 5 million emergency fund allocated by SNK for shipbuilding.
 Release 1 million rubles. from the state funds for the shipbuilding military program, obtained from the sale of unusable ships of the Morveda abroad.

October 29 - The USSR Labor and Defense Council decided to proceed with the restoration of 7 units of the naval staff of the Red Army, which were stored in military ports (Baltic: cruiser Svetlana; destroyers Prymislav; Captain Belly; Captain Kern; PL Trout "; Black Sea: the cruiser" Chervona Ukraine "; the destroyer" Corfu " ), for the impossibility of their content in the fleet in the period 1917–1923, or not completed in the First World War . These ships, in terms of their elements, have retained their modern combat value, and their restoration causes the expenditure of much smaller constructions of new units of the same type..

 1925 
January 10, 1925:

the head of the Naval Inspectorate of the TsKK RCP (b), S.I. Gusev, in a report to the Presidium of the TsKK RCP (b), noted:

 The General Directorate of Military Industry (GUVP) is not able to organize the correct management of the plants and the proper production of production on them, even in peacetime.

 Plant management is characterized by unsystematic nature, plant programs change several times a year, plants often perform work without any programs from the Center, there are cases of delivery of orders without drawings, materials and technical conditions .
 There is no control and improvement of special production at individual plants.
 Systematic deficit in the military program.
 High prices for manufactured products and a large percentage of poor quality products.
 A high percentage of service personnel in factories and low labor productivity.
 High overhead and unsatisfactory costing, bookkeeping and reporting.
 Inappropriate expenditure of funds released for the rehabilitation of plants (subsidies)

 Loans issued for service in the amount of the estimated purpose do not take into account whether the military program has been completed over the past period and whether the manufactured products meet the technical conditions . This order of financing enables the GUVP to account for the money received at the highest prices for its products, and Voenved is forced at these prices to accept the GUVP products.
 It is necessary to change the financing of GUVP, setting the release of loans for armaments of the military department, so that the financing of GUVP and payment for orders made on the basis of an agreement concluded between the military department and the GUVP.
 Due to the fact that military factories can not be fully loaded with military orders, many of them were established production of peaceful products. Insufficient knowledge of the requirements of the market leads to the fact that such assortments of goods are developed, to which the market makes a very weak demand, which leads to unprofitability of the peaceful production of GUVP. According to the report at the conference GUUP in March 1924 of 10 million rubles. The developed peaceful production has items for 3.5 million rubles, which can only be sold for 500–900 thousand rubles. Thus, it turns out that the unprofitability of the peaceful production of GUVP covers at the expense of funds released by it according to the military estimate .

February 2, 1925:

- R.I. Berzin (Berzins), a representative of the Revolutionary Military Council of the USSR, a member of the Board of the Main Inspectorate for Emergency Situations, Mikhail Frunze, wrote to the Chairman of the Revolutionary Military Council of the USSR - "The military industry has two main tasks in relation to the military department:

 To prepare the plants for the execution of the mobilization plans of the military department in case of war .
 Execution of the annual assignments of the military department in peacetime.

May 25, 1925: Directive of the People's Commissar for Military and Naval Affairs of the USSR - Chairman of the Revolutionary Military Council of the USSR Frunze(from 11.06.1925, the Voroshilov ) and the head of the Navy of the Red Army, a member of the Revolutionary Military Council of the USSR VI Zof introduced the first Charter ship service of the Red Army Navy. The charter of the naval service of the Red Army Navy regulated the order of service on the ship and the duties of the commanding officer, officers and privates, and also divided the personnel of the ship according to specialties.

 1926 
March 16: The Revolutionary Military Council of the USSR decided to approve the estimate for shipbuilding and ship repair in 1925/26.

May 28: Head of the Marine Forces of the Red Army V.I. Zof sent a memorandum to the naval commission to the Deputy Chairman of the USSR RVS I. S. Unshlikht about the need to adopt a 5-year construction program for the RKKF.

 1927 
July 30, 1927: Chief of Naval forces of the Red Army RA Muklevich and Chairman of the Revolutionary Military Council of the USSR  - Narkomvoenmor Voroshilovsent a circular letter to members of the Revolutionary Military Council of the USSR, the PBC MSBM, PBC MSCHM, commander of the SVR and the Leningrad Military District, Red Army Chief of State B. N. Levichev, P. Ye. Dybenko, Head of Supply of the Red Army, S. Kirov, First Secretary of the Leningrad Regional Committee of the All-Union Communist Party (Bolsheviks), and N. P. Komarov, Chairman of the Executive Committee of the Leningrad Council, on the results of the review of the Naval Forces of the Black Sea and the march of the ships MOrsk forces of the Baltic Sea .

 Soviet Navy in the pre war years (1937 - 1941) 
On December 30, 1937, the Navy of the Red Army was singled out into a separate service of the armed forces - the USSR Navy. On January 1, 1938, the surface composition of the Soviet Navy was small - 3 battleships, 3 cruisers, 1 leader and 17 destroyers. But the submarine fleet was a formidable force: 10 large submarines, 10 submarine minelayers, 78 medium submarines and 52 small submarines.

In 1936–41, four light cruisers of projects 26 and 26 bis, 3 leaders of the destroyers of the project 1, 3 leaders of the destroyers of destroyers of project 38, 1 of the destroyers of the project destroyer 20I, 28 destroyers of the project 7, 9 destroyers of the project 7-U, went into service.

Joseph Stalin hoped for assistance from either Nazi Germany or the United States in developing blue-water naval capabilities. After the Molotov–Ribbentrop Pact, the Nazi government gave the USSR naval plans and equipment including designs for the Bismarck-class battleship and the completed German cruiser Lützow, in exchange for allowing the Kriegsmarine to use Soviet ports and naval facilities in the Arctic Ocean. Adolf Hitler did this because he calculated that naval warfare would play little role in his planned invasion of the Soviet Union.

On April 29, 1939, Nikolai Kuznetsov, 34, was appointed People's Commissar of the Navy . He became the youngest Commissar of the Union and the first seaman in this position. Throughout the prewar years, Kuznetsov continued to prepare the fleet for war, in keeping with the experience of the Winter War with Finland. In 1940–1941, a system of operational readiness of fleets and flotillas was developed and put into effect, the expediency of which was justified at the beginning of World War II . The order of 1941, issued from the People's Commissariat of the RKKF, demanded that anti-aircraft batteries be opened when foreign aircraft appeared over our bases - in March over Libau and Polar fired upon German reconnaissance aircraft (this caused Stalin's displeasure and Kuznetsov was reprimanded).

By the beginning of World War II, the RKKF naval squadron consisted of 3 battleships, 7 cruisers, 59 leaders and destroyers, 218 submarines, 269 torpedo boats, 22 patrol ships, 88 minesweepers, 77 submarine hunters and a number of other ships and boats also auxiliary vessels. In the construction were 219 ships, including 3 battleships, 2 heavy and 7 light cruisers, 45 destroyers, 91 submarines.

 Soviet Navy during World War II 

On June 22, 1941, at 3:00 AM, the Luftwaffe made air raids on the main base of the Black Sea Fleet in Sevastopol and on the city of Izmail.

On June 22, 1941 at 03:06 AM, the commander of Black Sea Fleet, Rear Admiral I.D. Eliseev ordered to open fire on the German aircraft that had entered in the deep Soviet territory, and this went down in history: the first military order to repel the Nazis who attacked the Soviet Union during the Great Patriotic War.

In Sevastopol Naval Base, in order to block the Black Sea Fleet, electromagnetic mines were dropped on the entrance channel of thebase and in the North Bay. The enemy aircraft encountered fire from anti-aircraft artillery and ships of the Danube Flotilla. Liepaja and Riga naval bases were also subject to air attacks . Magnetic mines were dropped from aircraft in the Kronstadt area. They bombed the main base of the Northern Fleet  - Polar. On June 22, having reported to the Kremlin about the raid on Sevastopol, Admiral Kuznetsov, without waiting for instructions from above, ordered all the fleets: "Immediately start laying minefields according to the cover plan."

The main enemy of the fleet with the beginning of the war was not the sea, but the air and land forces of the enemy . The main thing in the fleet's combat activity was to assist the maritime flank of ground forces in defense and offensive (during the war years, up to 85% of the ship artillery ammunition was spent on coastal targets and up to 40% of naval aviation sorties were made to attack ground forces).

The second most important group of tasks is the violation of the enemy's sea communications, the defense of their communications, the destruction of the enemy's forces at sea, and the striking of targets on its coast and territory. Solving these tasks, the RKKF conducted 88 military operations, 23 of which were involved in participation in army and front-line operations.

The fate of the Second World War and the Great Patriotic War was decided on the land front, so the fleet plans and its actions were often subordinate to the interests of the ground forces in the maritime sectors. During the war years, the USSR Navy deployed over 400 thousand people to land fronts.

 Soviet Navy during the Cold War 

 Russian Navy after dissolution for the Soviet Union 

In 2022 the Russian Navy took part in the invasion of Ukraine, starting with the attack on Snake Island at the beginning of the war. The siege became infamous when the Ukrainian defenders told the Russian cruiser Moskva, flagship of the Black Sea; "Russian warship, go fuck yourself". Moskva sunk on 14 April 2022 after a fire broke out and forced the crew to evacuate. The Ukrainian military reported that they hit the ship with Neptune anti-ship missiles, however the Russian military did not confirm this. The ship subsequently capsized and sank while the Russian Navy was attempting to tow her into port. The sinking of Moskva is the most significant Russian naval loss in action since World War II. If Ukraine's assertion that the ship was sunk in a missile strike are true, Moskva is the largest warship to be sunk in action since World War II. The last time a warship of similar size was sunk was the slightly smaller Argentine cruiser ARA General Belgrano, which was sunk by the British Royal Navy in 1982 during the Falklands War. Moskva was the largest Soviet or Russian ship to be sunk by enemy action since German aircraft bombed the Soviet battleship Marat in 1941, and the first loss of a Russian flagship in wartime since the 1905 sinking of the battleship Knyaz Suvorov during the Battle of Tsushima in the Russo-Japanese War. If Ukrainian claims are true, Moskva'' might be the largest warship ever disabled or destroyed by a missile, according to Carl Schuster, a retired US Navy captain and former director of operations at the US Pacific Command's Joint Intelligence Center.

See also 
 Russian Navy
 Imperial Russian Navy
 Soviet Navy

References

External links 
 History of the Russian Navy 
 Historical essay on Russian fleet
 History of Imperial Russian Fleet

Imperial Russian Navy
Naval history of Russia
Soviet Navy